Alluwe is a ghost town in Nowata County, Oklahoma.  The post office was established as Lightening Creek on October 23, 1872, after the namesake waterway.  On June 27, 1883, the town was renamed Alluwe.  The post office existed under this new name until July 31, 1909.

History
Settled as a community by the Delaware Indians.

Oil was discovered in 1905.

In the 1950s the U.S. Army Corps of Engineers constructed the Oologah Dam across the Verdigris River to form Oologah Lake.  The townsite was purchased by the government since it was within the Oologah Reservoir project area.  Many residents moved a short distance eastward and formed New Alluwe.

See also
New Alluwe

References

Ghost towns in Oklahoma
Populated places in Nowata County, Oklahoma